Millikan is a lunar impact crater in the northern hemisphere of the Moon's far side. It is located to the north of the crater H. G. Wells, and to the southwest of von Békésy.

The rim edge of Millikan is roughly circular and well-defined, but with some irregularities. There are some small outward bulges along the south and east where the edge has slumped inwards somewhat. The inner walls lacks a terrace structure that is seen, for example, in the smaller Cantor to the south. The interior floor of Millikan is relatively level, and there is a small, bowl-shaped crater to the north of the midpoint. Offset to the west of the middle is a low central peak. The floor is also marked by a number of tiny craterlets.

Satellite craters
By convention these features are identified on lunar maps by placing the letter on the side of the crater midpoint that is closest to Millikan.

References

 
 
 
 
 
 
 
 
 
 
 
 

Impact craters on the Moon